Brahmanandam is an Indian actor and comedian working mostly in Telugu films. He currently holds the Guinness World Record for the most screen credits for a living actor. In 2009, he was honoured with the Padma Shri, for his contribution to Indian cinema. Brahmanandam was part of the television quiz show Brahmi 1 million Show on I-News. He appeared in more than 1,050 (one thousand fifty) films. He also been as a judge in the 2018 Telugu Television Stand-up comedy show, The Great Telugu Laughter Challenge.

Telugu films

As an actor

As a voice actor

As singer

Tamil films

Kannada films

Television

References

Indian filmographies
Male actor filmographies